The Hollow Field is a 1929 novel by the French writer Marcel Aymé. It tells the story of the rivalry between two farming villages, Cantagrel and Cessigney, which is triggered after a failed attempt at tobacco smuggling. An English translation by Helen Waddell was published in 1933.

The novel received the Prix Renaudot. It was adapted into the 1951 film , directed by Henri Verneuil and starring Fernandel, Maria Mauban and Fernand Sardou.

References

External links
 Publicity page at Éditions Gallimard's website 

1929 French novels
French novels adapted into films
French-language novels
Novels by Marcel Aymé